Saint Andrew's Day, also called the Feast of Saint Andrew or Andermas, is the feast day of Andrew the Apostle. It is celebrated on 30 November (according to Gregorian calendar) and on 13 December (according to Julian calendar). Saint Andrew is the disciple in the New Testament who introduced his brother, the Apostle Peter, to Jesus, the Messiah.

Traditions and celebrations
Saint Andrew's Day marks the beginning of the traditional Advent devotion of the Saint Andrew Christmas Novena.

Saint Andrew's Day is Scotland's official national day. It has been a national holiday in Romania since 2015. He is the patron saint of Cyprus, Scotland, Greece (City of Patras), Romania, Russia, Ukraine, the Ecumenical Patriarchate of Constantinople, San Andres Island (Colombia), Saint Andrew (Barbados) and Tenerife (Spain).

Scotland
The celebration of Saint Andrew as a national festival among some social strata and locales is thought to originate from the reign of Malcolm III (1058–1093). It was thought that the ritual slaughter of animals associated with Samhain was moved to this date so as to assure enough animals were kept alive for winter. But it is only in more recent times that 30 November has been given national holiday status, although it remains a normal working day.

Bank holiday

In 2006, the Scottish Parliament passed the St. Andrew's Day Bank Holiday (Scotland) Act 2007, which designated the Day as an official bank holiday. If 30 November falls on a weekend, the next Monday is a bank holiday instead. Although it is a "bank holiday", banks are not required to close (and in practice will remain open as normal) and employers are not required to give their employees the day off as a holiday.  Likewise, schools remain open. 

The University of St Andrews traditionally gives the day for all the students as a free holiday, but this is not a binding rule.

Saltire

Saint Andrew's Day is an official flag day in Scotland. The Scottish Government's flag-flying regulations state that the flag of Scotland (the Saltire or Saint Andrew's Cross) shall fly on all its buildings with a flagpole. Prior to 2002, the Scottish Government followed the UK Government's flag days and would fly the Saltire on Saint Andrew's Day only. The regulations were updated to state that the Union Flag would be removed and replaced by the Saltire on buildings with only one flagpole.

The flying of the Union Flag from Edinburgh Castle on all days, including Saint Andrew's Day, causes anger among some Scottish politicians and Scottish nationalists who have argued that the Saltire should fly on 30 November instead. However, the Union Flag is flown by the British Army at the Castle as it is an official British Army flag flying station.

Celebrations

In Scotland, and many countries with Scottish connections, Saint Andrew's Day is marked with a celebration of Scottish culture, and with traditional Scottish food and music. In Scotland the day is also seen as the start of a season of Scottish winter festivals encompassing Saint Andrew's Day, Hogmanay and Burns Night. There are week-long celebrations in the town of St Andrews and in some other Scottish cities.

Barbados
Saint Andrew's Day is celebrated as the national day of Independence in Barbados.  As the patron saint, Saint Andrew is celebrated in a number of Barbadian symbols including the cross formation of the Barbadian Coat of Arms, and the former Order of Barbados which styled recipients as Knight or Dame of St Andrew.

Romania
There are a few pre-Christian Romanian traditions connected to Saint Andrew's Day, some of them having their origin in the Roman celebrations of the god Saturn, most famously the Saturnalia.

The Dacian New Year took place from 14 November until 7 December; this was considered the interval when time began its course. One of the elements that came from the Roman and Thracian celebrations concerned wolves. During this night, wolves are allowed to eat all the animals they want. It is said that they can speak, too, but anyone who hears them will soon die. Early on Saint Andrew's day, the mothers go into the garden and gather tree branches, especially from apple, pear and cherry trees, and also rosebush branches. They make a bunch of branches for each family member. The one whose bunch blooms by New Year's Day will be lucky and healthy the next year. The best known tradition connected to this night concerns matrimony and premonitory dreams. Single girls must put under their pillow a sprig or branch of sweet basil. If someone takes the plants in their dreams, that means the girl will marry soon. They can also plant wheat in a dish and water it until New Year's Day. The nicer the wheat looks that day, the better the year to come.

Serbia
On Saint Andrew's day in 1806 Serbs liberated Belgrade from Ottoman rule. On December 12, 1830 (St. Andrew's Day) the Hatt-i şerif was read before the assembly in Belgrade. The document has defined the autonomy of Serbia as a part of the Ottoman Empire, and the additional berat confirmed Prince Miloš as the hereditary ruler of the Serbian Principality. St. Andrew's Day was instituted as the Statehood Restoration Day, and was celebrated during the rule of the Obrenović dinasty until 1903.

Saint Andrew's Eve
In parts of Ukraine, Germany, Austria, Slovakia, Poland, Russia and Romania, a superstitious belief exists that the night before Saint Andrew's Day is especially suitable for magic that reveals a young woman's future husband or that binds a future husband to her. The day was believed to be the start of the most popular time for vampire activity, which would last until Saint George's Eve (22 April).

In Poland, the holiday Andrzejki is celebrated on the night of the 29th through 30 November. Traditionally, the holiday was only observed by young single girls, though today both young men and women join the party to see their futures. The main ceremony involved pouring hot wax from a candle through the hole in a key into cold water.

In Romania, it is customary for young women to put 41 grains of wheat beneath their pillow before they go to sleep, and if they dream that someone is coming to steal their grains that means that they are going to get married next year. Also in some other parts of the country the young women light a candle from Easter and bring it, at midnight, to a fountain. They ask Saint Andrew to let them glimpse their future husband. Saint Andrew is invoked to ward off wolves, who are thought to be able to eat any animal they want on this night, and to speak to humans. A human hearing a wolf speak to him will die. Saint Andrew is also the patron saint of Romania and the Romanian Orthodox Church.

In Póvoa de Varzim, an ancient fishing town in northern Portugal, Cape Santo André (Portuguese for Saint Andrew) is a place that shows evidence of Romanisation and of probable earlier importance, with hints of Stone Age paintings. Near the cape there are small depressions in a rock, a mystery stone, that the people believe are the footprints of Saint Andrew.  Saint Andrew's Chapel is of probable mediaeval origin, referenced in 1546 and in earlier documents. It is the burial site of drowned fishermen found at the cape. Fishermen also requested intervention from the saint for better catches. Single girls wanting to get married threw a little stone to the roof of the chapel, hoping it would lodge. Because of pagan syncretism, it is also associated with white magic up to the present day. It was common to see groups of fishermen, holding lights in their hands, making a pilgrimage to the cape's chapel along the beach on Saint Andrew's Eve. They believed Saint Andrew fished, from the depths, the souls of the drowned. Those who did not visit Santo André in life would have to make the pilgrimage as a corpse.

Eton College 
St Andrew’s Day has become one of the two biggest holidays marked at Eton College, the other being the Fourth of June.

See also

 Calendar of saints
 General Roman Calendar

References

External links

 Saint Andrew on Electric Scotland
 St Andrew's Day 2019: How did a fisherman become Scotland's patron saint?
Culture.pl: The Polish Tradition of Andrzejki

Andrew the Apostle
Catholic holy days
Scottish culture
Holidays in Scotland
Folk calendar of the East Slavs
National days
November observances
Andrew
Winter events in Scotland
Christmas in Scotland
Christmas-linked holidays
Scottish-Australian culture
Public holidays in Romania
British flag flying days
Patronal festivals in Scotland
Andrew